Janusz Kruk (7 August 1946 – 18 June 1992) was a Polish singer, guitarist and composer, the leader of the popular band 2 Plus 1.

Career
Kruk went to a musical school in Warsaw, where he learned to play double bass. At the end of the 1960s, he founded the band Warszawskie Kuranty, a member of whose was also Elżbieta Dmoch. In January 1971, Janusz and Elżbieta formed a new group, 2 Plus 1, which would become highly successful in Poland in the 1970s and the first half of the 1980s. On the turn of decades the band scored a number of minor hits in Western Europe and Japan, and released two albums internationally.

Kruk had been the leader of the band until his death in the early 1990s. He has composed most of the songs in 2 Plus 1's repertoire and holds arrangement and production credits for most of the albums, except for the two English-language LPs, Easy Come, Easy Go and Warsaw Nights. In the mid-late 1980s Kruk started composing musical scores for various theatre plays.

Private life
Kruk has been married three times. For over fifteen years his wife was Elżbieta Dmoch, the co-founder of 2 Plus 1. The couple married in February 1973 and divorced in the late 1980s, after Janusz had left her for another woman.

Janusz Kruk died from a heart attack on 18 June 1992, aged 45, leaving behind his partner and two children. Prior to this, he had been struggling with cardiac problems. His death turned out to be a deep shock for Elżbieta, who has since become reclusive.

References

1946 births
1992 deaths
Musicians from Warsaw
Polish country singers
Polish folk singers
Polish male guitarists
Polish pop singers
Polish rock singers
Polish singer-songwriters
20th-century guitarists
20th-century Polish male  singers